Michael Rhodes (birth unknown) is a former professional rugby league footballer who played in the 1990s and 2000s. Rhodes was selected for the Scotland squad for the 2000 Rugby League World Cup, but he did not play in any of Scotland's three matches.

Rhodes made his début for Featherstone Rovers on Monday 27 December 1999, and he played his last match for Featherstone Rovers during the 2001–season.

References

External links

Living people
English people of Scottish descent
English rugby league players
Featherstone Rovers players
Place of birth missing (living people)
Rugby league fullbacks
Year of birth missing (living people)
Rugby articles needing expert attention